The 2017 Winston–Salem Open was a men's tennis tournament played on outdoor hard courts. It was the 49th edition of the Winston-Salem Open (as successor to previous tournaments in New Haven and Long Island), and part of the ATP World Tour 250 Series of the 2017 ATP World Tour. It took place at Wake Forest University in Winston-Salem, North Carolina, United States, from August 20 through August 26, 2017. It was the last event on the 2017 US Open Series before the 2017 US Open.

Singles main-draw entrants

Seeds

* Rankings are as of August 14, 2017

Other entrants
The following players received wildcards into the singles main draw:
  Petros Chrysochos 
  Borna Ćorić
  Taylor Fritz 
  Ernests Gulbis

The following players received entry using a protected ranking:
  Ričardas Berankis
  Dmitry Tursunov

The following players received entry from the qualifying draw:
  Alex Bolt 
  Rogério Dutra Silva
  Kyle Edmund 
  Márton Fucsovics

The following players received entry as lucky losers:
  Jonathan Eysseric
  Dominik Köpfer

Withdrawals
Before the tournament
  Kevin Anderson →replaced by  Dominik Köpfer
  Nikoloz Basilashvili →replaced by  Thiago Monteiro
  Thomaz Bellucci →replaced by  Jonathan Eysseric
  Ryan Harrison →replaced by  Thomas Fabbiano
  Nicolas Mahut →replaced by  Andreas Seppi
  Sam Querrey →replaced by  Andrey Rublev
  Diego Schwartzman →replaced by  Norbert Gombos

Retirements
  Julien Benneteau

Doubles main-draw entrants

Seeds

 Rankings are as of August 14, 2017

Other entrants
The following pairs received wildcards into the doubles main draw:
  Skander Mansouri /  Christian Seraphim
  Leander Paes /  Purav Raja

The following pair received entry as alternates:
  Andrés Molteni /  Adil Shamasdin

Withdrawals
Before the tournament
  Juan Sebastián Cabal

Champions

Singles

  Roberto Bautista Agut def.  Damir Džumhur, 6–4, 6–4

Doubles

  Jean-Julien Rojer /  Horia Tecău def.  Julio Peralta /  Horacio Zeballos, 6–3, 6–4

External links
Official website

2017 ATP World Tour
2017 US Open Series
2017 in American tennis
2017
August 2017 sports events in the United States